Víctor Urruchúa (30 December 1912 – 1981) was a Mexican actor, film director and screenwriter. He appeared in 24 films between 1926 and 1951. He also directed 15 films between 1944 and 1953.

Selected filmography
 Two Monks (1934 - actor)
 Judas (1936 - actor)
 The Priest's Secret (1941 - actor)
 Simón Bolívar (1942 - actor)
 Ramona (1946 - directed)
 Luz en el páramo (1953 - directed)

References

External links

1912 births
1981 deaths
Mexican male film actors
Mexican film directors
Mexican people of Basque descent
20th-century Mexican male actors
20th-century Mexican screenwriters
20th-century Mexican male writers